The following streetcar lines once operated in Queens, New York City, United States.

BMT
The Brooklyn-Manhattan Transit Corporation concentrated on Brooklyn, but had some lines into Queens. Only the ones that significantly entered Queens are shown here; see list of streetcar lines in Brooklyn for the others (mainly into Ridgewood).

Long Island Electric
The Long Island Electric Railway operated lines in eastern Queens until 1926. These lines were later operated by Jamaica Central Railways, until the company reorganized as Jamaica Buses, with bus service replacing trolley service in 1933.

Manhattan and Queens Traction
The Manhattan and Queens Traction Company was originally part of the South Shore Traction Company based in Sayville, New York, which planned to build lines throughout Central and Western Suffolk, as well as Nassau and Queens County, before selling off its only lines to the Suffolk Traction Company, and moving to New York City. Before reorganizing itself as M&QT, it operated a line across the Queensboro Bridge from Manhattan to Long Island City until April 1937.

New York and Long Island Traction
The New York and Long Island Traction Company operated east to Freeport, Hempstead, and Mineola in Nassau County.

New York and Queens County
The New York and Queens County Railway operated in northern Queens. In 1932 it was reorganized as the New York and Queens Transit Corporation, and ended trolley service as it evolved into the Queens-Nassau Transit Lines in 1937.

Steinway Lines [1922-1939]

The Steinway Railway operated in northwestern Queens. In the Fall of 1939 the company was renamed as Steinway Omnibus and began operating bus lines over former trolley lines and in 1959 changed their name again to Steinway Transit.

Ocean Electric
The Ocean Electric Railway operated on The Rockaways.

New York and North Shore Traction
The New York and North Shore Traction Company operated from northeastern Queens east into Nassau County.  By 1920, the company converted itself into the North Shore Bus Company.

See also
 List of streetcar lines in the Bronx
 List of streetcar lines in Brooklyn
 List of streetcar lines in Manhattan
 List of streetcar lines in Staten Island
 List of streetcar lines on Long Island
 List of town tramway systems in the United States

References

Williams Map and Guide Company, Map of the borough of Queens, 1923
Chicago Transit & Railfan Web Site: New York City Transit
 The New York and Queens County Railway AND The Steinway Lines 1867-1939, Vincent F. Seyfried, 1950
The Don Harold and Francis J. Goldsmith, Jr. Brooklyn El and Trolley Pages (The JoeKorNer: Brooklyn Trolleys)
 , Edition of June 30, 2003
Lost Trolleys of Queens and Long Island by Stephen L. Meyers (2006).

 
Queens
Queens, New York-related lists